Ecosocial theory, first proposed by name in 1994 by Nancy Krieger of the Harvard T.H. Chan School of Public Health, is a broad and complex theory with the purpose of describing and explaining causal relationships in disease distribution.  While it incorporates biological and psychosocial influences on disease occurrence, the theory is also suited to analyze the relationships between social factors and disease development in public health research.  The core constructs of Ecosocial Theory are: Embodiment; Pathways to Embodiment; the cumulative interplay between exposure, resistance, and susceptibility; and agency and accountability. Further, the theory specifies that all constructs must be considered in concert, as they work together in a synergistic explanation of disease distribution.  The theory assumes that distributions of disease are determined at multiple levels and that analyses must incorporate historical, political economic, temporal, and spatial analyses

Key constructs 
The key constructs of ecosocial theory are:
 embodiment
 pathways to embodiment
 the cumulative interplay of exposure, susceptibility, and resistance
 agency and accountability
All of these constructs work together and must be understood in order to assess the impact of multiple levels of influence on the distribution of disease in populations.  Embodiment describes the literal physical incorporation of the social and biological world into an individual's body.  Embodiment is an active process (a verb-like noun), in that the relationship between bodies and the world around them is reciprocal, cyclical, and synergistic.  Pathways to Embodiment describes the various ways that social, biological, and environmental forces may interact with an individual's body in context.  Pathways must be explored on various spatio-temporal scales in order to understand the complex interplays that can occur through history, inter-generationally, across the lifecourse; as well as at global, national, societal, familial, and molecular levels.  Cumulative Interplay describes how patterns of disease occur within a social, ecological, and biological context.  It emphasizes how individuals in different socio-economic positions have different exposures, susceptibilities, and resistance (both biological and political) to disease, based on their unique histories and experiences over the lifecourse, based on spatio-temporal factors and the interaction with groups, power structures, discrimination, and inequality.  Agency and Accountability claims that the State is a responsible agent in the patterns of disease distribution in a given society.  In contrast to biomedical and lifestyle theories of disease distribution, the social system that creates discrimination and inequalities are also responsible for patterns of disease.  Further, Krieger expands this construct to include the accountability we as epidemiologists have in the identification and treatment of health disparities, and the obligation we have to explicitly identify our theoretical lens, as well as to become activists, not just researchers, when we observe injustice.

History 
The theory was influenced by the work of proponents of Social Medicine in the 19th and early 20th centuries, such as Louis-René Villermé, Rudolf Virchow, Friedrich Engels, and Karl Marx; as well as by the more recent work of Social Production of Disease (SPD) theorists, including Sydenstricker, Goldberg, and Davey-Smith.  The theory of Social Production of Disease (SPD) explains the way that capitalist societies of the 21st century tend to value consumption over production and wealth over the well-being of their citizens.  The roots of SPD lie in the research and writings of Villerme, Virchow, and Engels, who discussed the poor working conditions and diseases of working class Europeans around the time of the Industrial Revolution in the late 19th century.  In the U.S. in the 1930s, the statistician Sydenstrickker examined how poor living and working conditions could cause disease in impoverished populations, and used daily living data to determine proximal biological causes of these population-level disease distributions.  Thereafter, both medicine and epidemiology were overtaken by biomedical and lifestyle theories of disease, which explained population level patterns as mere aggregates of events taking place at the cellular level within individuals.  Social factors in epidemiology were largely ignored until Doyal, Navarro, and others proposed the theories of SPD and Political Economy of Health in the 1970s, and Krieger later integrated these theories into her writings on Ecosocial Theory (1994, 2011).  As described by Doyal, SPD consists of the following key constructs: (1) The distribution of disease in a population will pattern along social, economic, and political lines in a given society. (2) The State is at least partly responsible for the health of its citizens. (3) Increases in life expectancy in developed countries have been at the expense of the health of less developed countries. (4) Societies valuing profit, consumption, capitalism, and wealth over the well-being of their people and environments will reflect these priorities in the unequal distribution of disease in the poor and disempowered classes.

Ecosocial theory builds on these theories by incorporating biological explanations, a lifecourse perspective, and a multilevel perspective over space and time, to describe associations between exposures and disease, with an explicit focus on inequalities in health status among subjugated groups.

According to ecosocial theory, as influenced by writings on SPD, it is both consumption and production at the societal level that contributes to patterns of disease.  The distribution of income, access to healthcare, education, and occupation is not equal in most societies; and often follows power dynamics that repress women, people of color, sexual minorities, and other discriminated groups.  Patterns of health and disease follow this socio-political ordering, and determine in part the distribution of disease in societies over time.

Examples of the application 
As an example, rates of obesity are not evenly distributed in the United States.  People with lower socio-economic position (SEP) tend to have higher rates of obesity, on average; as do populations of African Americans, some Hispanics, and American Indians.  These differential rates by group cannot be explained by genetics or biology alone, as it is obvious that not all people with low SES or from racial/ethnic minority populations are obese, and there is no clear genetic link which could possibly explain the dramatic rise in obesity prevalence seen in the U.S. over the past 30 years.  Rather, social factors must be used to explain these disparities.
Taking a historical perspective, we can begin to describe the high rates of obesity seen among African Americans in the so-called "stroke belt" of the Southern U.S.  The history of slavery in this region helps in part to explain food culture among African Americans, since high calorie and fat foods were essential to the enslaved ancestors working on plantations.  The culture of food created in this setting, and transmitted over the centuries, still exists today, however the social and physical environment in which people live has changed dramatically.  Rather than spending hours in the hot sun doing physical labor for work, 21st century Americans often have jobs which are largely sedentary.  Cities and suburbs have developed around automobiles as the major means of transportation rather than walking or biking.  And fast food, sugar-sweetened beverages, and television have overtaken many areas and lives.  In addition, U.S. government subsidies support corn growers in producing corn syrup, and successful corporations often market food that is easy, convenient, full of fat and calories, and cheap.  For African Americans in the South who still suffer from economic discrimination due to this history of racism, non-nutritious foods are often the only affordable options in the food deserts in which they live.  At multiple levels of political and social order then, we see using Ecosocial Theory that history, policy, culture, and the social and built environments drive the inequalities in the distribution of obesity seen in African Americans today.  This places agency and accountability at the structural and socio-historical level, rather than on obese individuals themselves.

Similar analyses can be examined in multiple generations of Hispanic immigrants as they acculturate to the United States, American Indians and their history of abuse and repression in this country, and people of low SEP.  Ecosocial Theory could also help us examine how these social forces and pathways become embodied and incorporated into the physiological outcome of obesity over the lifecourse, for example by looking at dietary patterns during pregnancy and how this affects risk of obesity to the fetus as it ages and grows into an adult with an altered metabolism from early exposure.

References 

 
 Doyal, Lesley, and Imogen Pennell. The political economy of health. Pluto Pr, 1979.
 (Krieger, N., "Epidemiology and the web of causation: has anyone seen the spider?" Social Science and Medicine 1994; 39:887-903)
 
 
 
 

Theories